Joel Segal is one of the co-founders and a current board member of the Progressive Democrats of America.  He serves as Chair of the Congressional Universal Health Care Task Force and senior advisor to the Chairman of the United States House Committee on the Judiciary, Congressman John Conyers of Michigan. Segal is also the founder of the Free China Movement in the United States, that comprises over thirty Chinese Democracy organizations inside and outside of China, working for peace and democracy.

References 

American pacifists
Living people
Year of birth missing (living people)